Spirabutilon is a monotypic genus of flowering plants belonging to the family Malvaceae. The only species is Spirabutilon citrinum.

Its native range is Southeastern Brazil.

References

Malvoideae
Malvaceae genera
Monotypic Malvales genera